Plasmodium anomaluri is a parasite of the genus Plasmodium subgenus Vinckeia. As in all Plasmodium species, P. anomaluri has both vertebrate and insect hosts. The vertebrate hosts for this parasite are mammals.

Taxonomy 
The parasite was first described by Pringle in 1960.

Distribution 
This species is found in Tanzania.

Vectors
Not known.

Hosts 
This species infects African flying squirrels (Anomalurus fraseri orientalis).

References 

anomaluri